Aracely Arámbula Jacques (born March 6, 1975), known professionally as Aracely Arámbula, is a Mexican actress, model, singer, television personality and entrepreneur.

Life and career

Early life 
Aracely Arambula Jacques was born in Chihuahua City, Mexico, on March 6, 1975. At age 13, while attending high school, she began her road to fame, participating in beauty pageants. In 1996, Aracely won for "El rostro de El Heraldo de México", which launched her career.

Acting career
She began performing small roles in the telenovelas Prisionera de amor (1994), Acapulco, cuerpo y alma (1995) y Canción de Amor (1996). During her third year of studies at the Centro de Educación Artística of Televisa, Aracely received the opportunity to act in the telenovela Cañaveral de Pasiones.

In 1997 Aracely played the younger version of Veronica Castro's character in Pueblo Chico, Infierno Grande. Then acted in telenovelas El alma no tiene color and Rencor apasionado, where she played her first antagonistic role. Aracely Arambula got her first starring role in the teen telenovela Soñadoras (1998) and then participated in Alma Rebelde (1999).

Her consecration as the protagonist came with Abrázame muy fuerte produced by Salvador Mejía, in 2000. Aracely continued its success with the latest telenovela of her first stint as television actress: Las vías del amor (2002), where she also sang the theme song. Besides music and television, Aracely entered the theater with productions such as Muchachos de Nueva York, Coqueluche, and Hermanos de Sangre.

In 2008, Aracely paused in her acting career, but she took her time fame as hostess of the program Todo Bebé. In 2009, Aracely Arambula returned to television sets to star in the umpteenth version of Corazón salvaje, where she had a double role. In 2010, Aracely Arambula debuted as the protagonist of the play Perfume de Gardênia which many considered the rival show of Aventurera.

In 2013, Aracely returned to telenovelas with La Patrona, produced by Telemundo and Argos, where she shares credits with Christian Bach and Jorge Luis Pila. In addition she sang two songs for the telenovela. Also, after the success obtained in La Patrona, Telemundo chose her as the lead in a melodrama based on the classic novel by Victor Hugo, Les Misérables, which was produced in 2014.

Music career
She began in music singing nursery rhymes as part of a tribute to Francisco Gabilondo Soler entitled Ellas Cantan Cri Cri. In 2001, Arambula was part of the Abrazame Muy Fuerte soundtrack.

In 2003, Aracely Arambula was nominated at the Billboard Latin Music Awards in the categories of Best Album, Best Duo and Best Regional Mexican Song with her production "Sólo Tuya" (2003); subsequently released the studio album Sexy, produced by Selena's brother, A. B. Quintanilla. Arámbula also writes songs and plays guitar.

Arambula has recorded two songs for La Patrona. These songs include "La patrona" (the theme song of the telenovela), and "Juntos tú y yo". Arambula currently working on an upcoming studio album she plans to release in 2014. "We are working on the album and you will soon know the music, meanwhile, sounds in "La Patrona" two songs that I sing. Would be an unpublished and grupero, I like that style because I am north", said Arambula.

Personal life

Arambula has also dabbled as an entrepreneur, lending her image for a perfume and cosmetics company in Mexico. Her brother, Dr. Leonardo Arámbula, has also served as her longtime manager. They own a spa in Mexico City together.

From 2005 to 2009, Arambula dated Luis Miguel. They have two sons Miguel (born January 1, 2007) and Daniel (born December 18, 2008).

Filmography

Dubbing

Discography

Albums

Studio albums

Soundtrack albums

Singles

As lead artist

As featured artist

Promotional singles

Other appearances

Music videos

Awards and nominations

Notes
A: Top Latin Albums.
B:  Latin Songs.

References

External links 

Aracely Arámbula at the Telenovela Database

fulllatin.com
Aracely Arambula en Univision.com
fan website Aracely Arambula (Archived 2009-10-25)

1975 births
Living people
People from Chihuahua City
Mexican people of Basque descent
Mexican people of French descent
Mexican telenovela actresses
Mexican female models
Actresses from Chihuahua (state)
21st-century Mexican singers
21st-century Mexican women singers
Women in Latin music
21st-century Mexican women